The 2017 ABA League Supercup was the inaugural tournament of the ABA League Supercup, featuring teams from the Adriatic League First Division. The tournament took place in Bar, Montenegro.

Participants 
Based on the results in the 2016–17 ABA League season there was 8 participants at the 2017 Supercup.

  Crvena zvezda mts (1st, withdrew)
  Cedevita (2nd)
  Partizan NIS (3rd)
  Budućnost VOLI (4th)
  Igokea (5th)
  Mega Bemax (6th)
  Cibona (7th)
  Mornar (8th, host) 
  FMP (9th, replacement)

Crvena zvezda canceled their participation at the Supercup, due to their previously scheduled Euroleague tournament, which was held on the same period. The 9th placed team, the FMP, is invited for replacement.

Venue

Bracket

5th–8th place bracket

Source: ABA Supercup

Quarterfinals

Cedevita v FMP

Igokea v Mega Bemax

Budućnost VOLI v Cibona

Mornar v Partizan NIS

5th–8th place semifinals

FMP v Igokea

Cibona v Partizan NIS

Semifinals

Cedevita v Mega Bemax

Budućnost VOLI v Mornar

Seventh place game

Fifth place game

Third place game

Final

Final ranking

See also 
 2017–18 ABA League
Teams 
 2017–18 KK Crvena zvezda season
 2017–18 KK Partizan season

References

External links 
 Official website

Supercup 2017
2017–18 in Serbian basketball
2017–18 in Croatian basketball
2017–18 in Bosnia and Herzegovina basketball
2017–18 in Montenegrin basketball
Adriatic
International basketball competitions hosted by Montenegro